Özge Ulusoy (born October 28, 1982) is a Turkish model, retired ballet dancer, and occasional film actress. She is best known for her appearance in the popular TV-series Arka Sokaklar from 2006 to 2009. As a model, she walked the runways for Hussein Chalayan, Mavi Jeans, Mudo, Hervé Léger, Balenciaga, Eva Gronbach, Guy Laroche, Emanuel Ungaro, Christian Dior, Marks & Spencer, Harvey Nichols, Mango, etc. She held the first runner-up title for the annual beauty pageant Miss Turkey in 2003. In 2002, Ulusoy finished third in Elite Model Management's Elite Model Look competition, took second place the following year in the Miss Turkey competition, and won the Miss Turkey Universe 2003 title before signing with Uğurkan Erez Model Management in Istanbul. Since her debut, Ulusoy has been the face of a variety of advertising campaigns in Turkey.

Early life and career
Özge Ulusoy was born on October 28, 1982, in Ankara, the youngest and second of two children of H. Ulusoy, a retired chief military justice of Turkish Armed Forces, and Armağan (née ?), a former mayor. Ulusoy was raised a Muslim. She has an elder sister, Associate Professor Nilay Ulusoy, an academician in Bahçeşehir University and Marmara University and an alumna of Sorbonne.

Education 
A native of Izmir, Turkey, Özge Ulusoy is a graduate of faculty of fine arts in Hacettepe University, Mimar Sinan Fine Arts University and Yeditepe University, where she had classical ballet course and arts administration bachelor's degree. She passed her conservatory examinations to be accepted into these most considerable ballet schools at the age of 12. She has first studied in Hacettepe University, two years later she transferred to Mimar Sinan Fine Arts University in Istanbul.

Career

Miss Turkey 
Later in 2003, after holding the first runner-up for the Miss Turkey 2003 title she entered Yeditepe University where she majored in Arts administration with a specialty in classical ballet. In 2011, she finished fifth in Survivor: Ünlüler vs. Gönüllüler, the fifth season of Show TV's Turkish version of the reality television game show Survivor, produced by Acun Media.

Yok Böyle Dans 
In 2011, after heating up the stage on Yok Böyle Dans—the Turkish version of Dancing With the Stars—for weeks, Ulusoy won the show, along with her professional partner Vitali Kozmin. Subsequently, she acted in Show TV's comic science fiction series Ha Babam Uzay. She was cast as HRH The Princess Alev in Türk'ün Uzayla İmtihanı that was the identical successor of Ha Babam Uzay. She also hosted the backstage of Bugün Ne Giysem? which is a fashion competition on Show TV for one season before she became a judge on the show in 2012. Later that same year, she appeared as a special guest star in the thirty fourth episode of the Kanal D series Yalan Dünya as herself.

Personal life 
Ulusoy had been in a relationship with Hacı Sabancı, a member of the fourth generation of the renowned Sabancı family, since August 2011. However, they broke up in 2017.

Filmography

References

External links

 
 

1982 births
Hacettepe University alumni
Living people
Mimar Sinan Fine Arts University alumni
Miss Universe 2003 contestants
People from Ankara
Turkish ballerinas
Turkish beauty pageant winners
Turkish female models
Turkish film actresses
Yeditepe University alumni
Turkish television actresses